is a 1993 Japanese children's slice of life anime series primarily aimed at preschoolers and animated by Pierrot Plus based on the Kodomo Challenge Educational Learning Program created by Benesse in 1988. It is created and directed by veteran director Hisayuki Toriumi (Science Ninja Team Gatchaman) and character designs by Shigehito Tsuji. It aired at TV Setouchi and in all TXN TV networks in Japan from December 13, 1993, to March 31, 2008.

Overview
Shima Shima Tora no Shimajirō was officially created after Benesse and TV Setouchi both decided to adapt the Learning Program series into a full-fledged series for television, with part of the staff being former Tatsunoko Production director Hisayuki Toriumi and music composer Shin'ya Naitō. It was officially animated by Studio Pierrot's sister company, Pierrot Plus and premiered on December 13, 1993. The series ended after it aired its final episode on March 31, 2008, as the second series aired, alongside the children's variety series . All of the later episodes of the series were aired in the variety series in the later years which also includes live action segments.

Theme and elements
The overall theme surrounding the series all revolves in Shimajirō's life as a preschooler and all the lessons he needs to learn in a daily basis such as making friends, saying sorry, making a resolve and others that reflects to the preschool demographic. Also educational elements such as planting flowers, how to use the toilet for the first time, helping others and learning in kindergarten is also applied.

The anime's overall elements are all based on the Kodomo Challenge series, with the storyline being completely original from the source material.

Setting
The anime is officially set in the fictional  located somewhere in the world. The island, inhabited by anthropomorphic animals, is suburban and very self-sufficient in resources. Various animal characters in the island vary as well as their culture such as the Mole People who live under the island or the Squirrel people who always hibernate during winter. Various means of transport as well as subways exist in the island.
Aside from the animal characters, some characters such as Witches and Fairies exist in the island.

Story
The entire series focuses on Shimajiro Shimano, a curious tiger boy living in Challenge Island. Being the second in the family, he attends Kindergarten alongside his friends as they all discover everything around them, and learn valuable lessons as they grow up.

Characters
 / Shimajiro

Shimajiro is a yellow tiger and the only son of Shimano family. He is a bright little boy who likes doughnuts and playing soccer. He fears thunder and ghost stories, and does not like to eat green peppers. He is very supportive to his friends and to his younger sister Hana, but can sometimes be a bit stubborn. He can be mischievous and selfish, but he always learns his lesson and is always there when his friends and little sister, Hannah (Hana in the Japanese versions), need him.

 / Flappie

One of Shimajiro's childhood friends and his best friend, Flappie is a green parrot. He usually has red, blue and yellow feathers on his head and has few tail feathers on his back, as well as a loose tongue. In earlier series, he only wears a shirt, but starts wearing shorts as of Shimajiro: A World of WOW (Shimajirō no Wow). His Japanese name in the series is always mispronounced in several promotional materials. Flappie is an aspiring singer, but is somehow tone-deaf. He usually likes Takoyaki but like Shimajiro, he is easily scared of thunder, ghost stories and lastly by ghosts. Flappie, being a bird, has an ability to fly to survey things for his friends, and also can understand non-anthropomorphic birds. He usually lives with his grandmother and parents in a treehouse and is the oldest of four siblings.

 / Hannah

Hannah Shimano is a yellow tiger and the younger sister of Shimajiro who plays with her brother. She's also the daughter of Sakura and Shimataro.

 / Nikki
 
Also one of Shimajiro's childhood friends, Nikki is a pink cat with a cream-colored face. First introduced in Shimajirō: A World of Wow!, She is great at sports, caring, and always stands up to bullies. Naturally, she is always up for adventure with Shimajiro and his friends. She loves climbing trees, foot racing and sports, and dreams to become an Olympic athlete one day when she grows up. She moved into Challenge Island with her grandmother, mother and her younger brother and befriended Shimajiro and the others in the second episode. Her father, however, lives separately somewhere in Challenge Island.

 / Mimi-Lynne

Mimi-Lynne is a white bunny with black ear tips. Living in a family of florists, Mimi-Lynne loves cute things and strawberry shortcake as well as running. However she has a fear of insects. Usually she also has an overbite and her tail appears out of her skirt. She can be nice but spoiled, selfish and clumsy and has a habit on crying if someone doesn't favor her opinion sometimes. Mimi-Lynne is also a good aspiring singer as well. She initially is one of two characters in the series (the other being Ramurin) to not have an older sibling, but after Ramurin leaves Challenge Island in the series finale of Shimajirō Hesoka, Mimirin becomes the only one.

Also one of Shimajiro's childhood friends, Ramurin is a pink female supporting character lamb. Unlike other sheep, she herself does not have a white face. She initially wore a bow on her head but replaced it with a bandana in later episodes. Her own father is a painter, and aspires her to become one when she grows up one day. She loves Pudding, but she has fears of ghosts and she is not good at running fast. She also likes both sports Judo and Sumo. Unlike the other characters, Ramurin's mentality is much higher than the rest of the main cast and usually behaves like a responsible sister. Her catch phrase is "suspicious" and usually keeps her promises sometimes. Like Mimirin, she doesn't have any older sibling. She officially left Challenge Island along with her father during the last episode of Shimajirō Hesoka, and moved to France to achieve her goals. As a result, she is the only character who does not appear in any of the movies.

 / Dr. Roarson

Guest stars
Randy Brakes: Also known as Mr. Brake in the live action segment of Shimajiro. He appeared in the commercial episode "Children's Hope for English".

Bob: An English guest speaker who appeared in the live action segment of Shimajiro. He wears an alpine hat and teaches people how to speak English.

Media

Anime
The original series first aired on TV Setouchi from December 13, 1993, to March 31, 2008, becoming the 19th longest running anime in Japan from its debut to its final episode with a total of 726 episodes. The series officially has 7 opening songs and 7 ending songs. For the first series, the first opening is titled  by Shima Shima Kids and the second opening is titled  by Omi Minami. The first ending song is titled  by Shima Shima Kids, the second ending theme is titled  by M.S.J and the third ending is titled  by both Omi Minami and Bin Shimada.

The second series, Hakken Taiken Daisuki! Shimajirō, first aired on TV Setouchi and in all TXN stations on April 7, 2008 to March 29, 2010. The opening theme is titled  by Omi Minami, Miki Takahashi, Takumi Yamazaki and Saori Sugimoto. The ending song is titled , also by Omi Minami, Miki Takahashi, Takumi Yamazaki and Saori Sugimoto.

The third series, Shimajirō Hesoka aired on April 5, 2010 to March 26, 2012. The first opening is titled  by Aki Toyosaki and the second opening is titled  by Yusuke Kamiji.

The current series, Shimajirō: A World of Wow!, began airing on April 2, 2012. The first opening is titled  by Daudi Joseph and the second opening is titled  by HARCO. The ending theme is titled  by Puffy AmiYumi. This series is distributed internationally on YouTube by WildBrain Spark, who manages the franchise's English-language presence.

The official music of the series is composed by Shin'ya Naitō in the first series and by Akifumi Tada (Tenchi Muyo! GXP) in the later series. Shimajiro is one of the longest running anime series as well as any children’s tv series in general (the longest-running on record being Sesame Street, which has aired since 1969) or any long-running  series.

Films

Starting from Shimajirō: A World of Wow!, the series has 8 theatrical films produced.

Shimajirō to Fufu no Daibōken: Sukue! Nanairo no Hana (2013)
Shimajirō to Kujira no Uta (2014)
Shimajirō to Ōkina Ki (2015)
Shimajirō to Kuni Ehon (2016)
Shimajirō to Niji no Oashisu (2017)
Movie Shimajiro Maho no Shimano Daiboken (2018)
Shimajirō to Ururu no Heroland (2019)
Qiaohu and the Fantastic Flying Ship (2019) Also known as Shimajirō Soro To Soratofune (2021); Delayed from a previous 2020 release due to COVID-19 pandemic.
The Adventures of the Magic Island of Qiaohu (2021)Shimajirō to Kirakira Ōkoku no Ōji-sama (2022)

Critical reception
On its first airing, Shima Shima Tora no Shimajirō became TV Setouchi's most popular educational anime show in Japan, rivaling NHK's long running Okaasan to Issho. The anime is listed as one of the most popular Educational Preschool shows, with having a total of eight seasons that continues to three anime sequels, becoming Benesse's most successful adaptation of the Kodomo Challenge series. Reruns of the episodes are broadcast on other stations such as Kids Station and TV Tokyo.

The series became most popular in the Kanto region of Japan, and was widely popular among children, parents and adults, gaining a decent fanbase over the years. According to research done by Benesse in 2015, the series has 99.2% recognition among parents with children aged 0 to 6.

Awards
The latest series was also nominated in the 2016 International Emmy Awards for best animated series, alongside Ronia the Robber's Daughter.

Mascot popularity
The anime also made Shimajirō one of the most iconic anime characters in Japan for preschoolers, rivaling Anpanman in terms of ratings. On his initial release. He widely appeared in various Kodomo Challenge products and products from other companies and sponsors. Also, Takara Tomy and Benesse created a limited edition Tomica "Shimajiro Car" that is limitedly distributed to Kodomo Challenge members all over Japan. Japanese car company Toyota created a life-sized replica of the Tomica model, titled the "426GT Shimajirō Car " which is a Customized Toyota Estima Hybrid. In 2013, a new version of the car is released by called "426EV Shimajirō Car II", based on the Tesla Model S. Tomica released a model version of the car under the name "Dream Car Tomica Shimajiro II" in February 2014 for Kodomo Challenge members and a retail release in March 2014.

Overseas popularityShima Shima Tora no Shimajirō is officially released in various TV stations all across the world, excluding the United States. The Chinese dubbed version is known as Qiao Hu. In China it is known for having "...thoughtful and scrupulous tutoring methods, as well as elaborate educational materials." The show contains cartoons as well as acted out portions that feature the signature tiger mascot as well as a rabbit and a few actors.

According to another source, the firm which sponsored the character has franchises in Beijing and Shanghai which has been considered "successful" by many parents for its ability to inspire children with "good character" amid China's recent social issues. This idea is further reinforced as it teaches children "how to love to learn" "build positive personality and good habit", addressing the need in children's different stages of learning. In 2014, the firm plans big staging events in Beijing under the title "Dawn of the Adventure Island" in Beijing's Haidian Theater. The anticipated event is notable in that it is one of the first shows targeted towards an audience of children rather than "... conventional justice evil drama of violence and adult language of thinking... ", which is referring to Pleasant Goat and Big Big Wolf''. According to Amazon.com, the franchise was released on DVD in the year 2010.

In Taiwan, Shimajirō is the most popular character among children aged 0 to 6.

In America, some people who know the show compare it to another animated preschool series that is from the west, PBS Kids’ Daniel Tiger’s Neighborhood (2012-present) due to both shows being alike in plot and nature, complete with their own cast of colorful characters, and that the main characters of both shows are a family of tigers, complete with an elder son and a younger daughter. Both titular characters have their own set of friends and neighborly citizens. Although it is unconfirmed if this is a coincidence or that the longer running Shimajiro series has something to do with the Mister Rogers’ Neighborhood series and franchise as well, and this current long-running show began running while Mister Rogers’ Neighborhood was still on the air. Not a whole bunch of people in the United States know about Shima Shima Tora No Shimajiro due to the show’s obscurity.

Shimajiro falls in more obscure media. Due to this, merchandising of the show is only sold in stores in Japan and some other asian territories.

References

External links
  (franchise) 
 Anime official website at Benesse , 
 English version 
 Shimajiro: A World of WOW official website
 Shimajiro at TV Setouchi 
 Qiao Hu official website 
 
  Channel with English episodes of Shimajiro No Wow 

Animated preschool education television series
1990s preschool education television series
2000s preschool education television series
2010s preschool education television series
2020s preschool education television series
2010 Chinese television series debuts
1993 anime television series debuts
2008 anime television series debuts
2010 anime television series debuts
2012 anime television series debuts
Japanese children's animated comedy television series
Studio Signpost
TV Tokyo original programming
Television series about tigers
Animated television series about children
Animated television series about families
Japanese television series with live action and animation

1988 establishments in Japan
1993 Japanese television series debuts
2008 Japanese television series endings
2008 Japanese television series debuts
2010 Japanese television series endings
2010 Japanese television series debuts
2012 Japanese television series endings
2012 Japanese television series debuts
Benesse